Zotero is a free and open-source reference management software to manage bibliographic data and related research materials, such as PDF files. Features include web browser integration, online syncing, generation of in-text citations, footnotes, and bibliographies, an integrated PDF reader and note editor, as well as integration with the word processors Microsoft Word, LibreOffice Writer, and Google Docs. It was originally created at the Center for History and New Media at George Mason University, and, as of 2021, is developed by the non-profit Corporation for Digital Scholarship.

Etymology 
The name "Zotero" is loosely derived from the Albanian verb zotëroj, meaning "to master".

Features 
When the Zotero Connector extension is installed in a compatible web browser, a special icon appears in the browser toolbar when a catalog entry or a resource (book, article, thesis) is being viewed on many websites (such as library catalogs or databases like PubMed, Google Scholar, Google Books, Amazon.com, Wikipedia, and publishers' websites). Clicking this icon saves reference information to the Zotero library. Such functionality is made possible by 'translators' – short pieces of computer code, or scripts to understand the structure of web pages and to parse them into citations using its internal formats. For mobile devices or browsers that do not support the Zotero Connector extension a bookmarklet is available.

Zotero can also save a copy of the webpage, or, in the case of academic articles, a copy of the full text PDF. Users can then add notes, tags, attachments, and their own metadata. Items are organized through a drag-and-drop interface, and can be searched.

Selections of the local reference library data can later be exported as formatted bibliographies. Furthermore, all entries including bibliographic information and user-created rich-text memos of the selected articles can be summarized into an HTML report.

Zotero users can generate citations and bibliographies through word processor plugins, or directly in Zotero, using Citation Style Language styles. The house styles of most academic journals are available in Zotero, and the bibliography can be reformatted with a few clicks. Zotero also allows users to create their own customized citation styles.

Zotero can import and export citations from or to many formats, including Wikipedia Citation Templates, BibTeX, BibLateX, RefWorks, MODS, COinS, Citation Style Language/JSON, refer/BibIX, RIS, TEI, several flavours of RDF, Evernote, and EndNote.

Zotero can associate notes with bibliographic items. It can annotate PDFs and synchronize them with any of its desktop apps and its iOS app.

As of 2022, Zotero supports more than forty  languages (some of them not totally translated) . 

Zotero has no institutional customer support service, but the Zotero website provides extensive information, including instructional screencasts, troubleshooting tips, a list of known issues, and user forums. Questions and issues raised in the forums are answered quickly, with users and developers suggesting solutions. Many academic institutions provide Zotero tutorials to their members.

Most citation style and translator codes are written by volunteers from the community and, as open-source scripts, may be used by third party tools as well, for example Wikipedia's 'Citoid' citation generator.

Extensions, plugins, related applications

Extensions

Cita 
When using the Cita plugin, first released in 2021, Zotero supports automated retrieval and sharing of citation network data from and to external sources, and local citation network visualization. This further integrates Zotero to the Initiative for Open Citations ecosystem, including OpenCitations and Wikidata.

ZotFile 
PDFs (or other files) can be synchronized from Zotero to other mobile apps through the ZotFile plugin.

Juris-M 
Juris-M is a fork of Zotero with additional features supporting legal research and multilingual citations. It allows for multilingual citations, and translations and transliterations of citation fields and provides additional support for needs of scholars in fields of law. It was created by Frank Bennett, an associate professor of comparative law at Nagoya University, who continues to maintain it. Amongst the legal citation styles supported are the American Bluebook style, the UK OSCOLA style, and the Canadian McGill style. Many other European and Commonwealth jurisdictions are also supported.

Mobile apps 
Zotero mobile apps are available for iOS (iPad and iPhone) and for Android tablets and phones. The iOS app is developed by the creators of the Zotero desktop app and was released in March 2022. An Android app by Zotero is also under development.

Web library 
Synchronizing a library to zotero.org allows users to access and edit the library in the "web library" interface from any current web browser, including the mobile version of the website on a tablet or mobile phone. Users can save new references to the web library using its "magic wand" button.

ZoteroBib 
In May 2018, Zotero's creators launched the web-based bibliography tool ZoteroBib (zbib.org), where users can generate bibliographies on the web without installing Zotero or creating a Zotero account.

Financial support and awards
Development of Zotero has been funded by the Andrew W. Mellon Foundation, the Alfred P. Sloan Foundation, and the Institute of Museum and Library Services, as well as user donations.

Zotero has won awards from PC Magazine, Northwestern University's CiteFest competition, and the American Political Science Association.

History 
The first release of Zotero, 1.0.0b2.r1, was made available in October 2006 as an add-on for the Firefox web browser. Development of Zotero 1.0.x continued until May 2009, when Zotero 1.0.10 was released.

In 2008, Thomson Reuters sued the Commonwealth of Virginia and George Mason University, based on the claim that Zotero's developers had, in violation of the EndNote EULA, reverse-engineered EndNote and provided Zotero with the ability to convert EndNote's proprietary .ens styles into Citation Style Language (CSL) styles. George Mason University responded that they would not renew their site license for EndNote and that "anything created by users of Zotero belongs to those users, and that it should be as easy as possible for Zotero users to move to and from the software as they wish, without friction". The journal Nature editorialized that "the virtues of interoperability and easy data sharing among researchers are worth restating. Imagine if Microsoft Word or Excel files could be opened and saved only in these proprietary formats, for example. It would be impossible for OpenOffice and other such software to read and save these files using open standards—as they can legally do."

The case was dismissed on June 4, 2009 due to a lack of jurisdiction. Although the Virginia Supreme Court granted an appeal to Thomson Reuters in this case on December 18, 2009, the appeal was withdrawn on January 11, 2011. 

Zotero 2.0, released in February 2010, added online features such as metadata and file syncing and group libraries, and included a license change from the Educational Community License to GPLv3. Development of Zotero 2.0.x continued until October 2010, when Zotero 2.0.9 was released.

Zotero 2.1, released in March 2011, adds CSL 1.0 support, Firefox 4 compatibility (the minimum is Firefox 3.6), and Zotero Commons, through which materials can be uploaded to the Internet Archive.

Zotero Standalone, first released in January 2011, allowed Zotero to be run as an independent program outside Firefox. Browser connectors were available to use Zotero Standalone with the web browsers Safari and Chrome.

Zotero 3.0, released in January 2012, includes the stable release of Zotero Standalone as well as several new major features, including overhauled Word and LibreOffice integration and duplicate detection. Version 3.0 also introduced the Zotero bookmarklet for iOS browsers, Android browser, Chrome for Android, Firefox mobile, and Opera mobile allowing uses to save reference data to their Zotero library when using mobile devices.

Zotero 4.0, released in April 2013, includes new features such as automatic journal abbreviations, direct downloading of PDFs to Zotero Standalone from the Zotero Firefox plugin, a single save button on the Zotero browser plugin (which combines the functionality of the address bar icon and the “Create Web Page Item from Current Page” button), colored tags, and on-demand file syncing.

Zotero 5.0, released in July 2017, did away with the Firefox plugin, replacing it with a Firefox connector for the new standalone product, which was now simply branded as the Zotero app. This move was the result of Mozilla discontinuing its powerful extension framework on which Zotero for Firefox was based. The Zotero Connectors for Chrome and Safari were also revamped, and given additional features. A point update also introduced a new PDF recognizer, using a Zotero-designed web service that doesn't rely on Google Scholar, to retrieve metadata for PDF files.

In October 2018, automatic PDF file retrieval, until then limited to directly saving from original web sources, was expanded to include open-access PDF files available at Unpaywall, and integration with word processors was extended to include Google Docs through the Firefox and Chrome connectors. In June 2019, as the result of a collaboration with Retraction Watch, Zotero started flagging retracted publications in its app, and warns users who try to cite retracted articles.

With the release of version 6.0, Zotero added an integrated PDF viewer and annotation functionality, in addition to a new note editor. An iOS app was also released.

See also

 Comparison of reference management software
 Citation Style Language (CSL)
 CiteProc
 JabRef
 LibX
 ScrapBook – A Firefox extension having similar capture features, but no bibliographic functions
 unAPI

References

Further reading
  Covers both Zotero standalone and the now obsolete (version 4.x) Firefox plugin version, as noted in review:

External links

 

2006 software
Free and open-source software
Free reference management software
Library 2.0
Linux software
Macintosh software
Software that uses XUL
Software using the GNU AGPL license
Unsigned free Firefox WebExtensions
Windows software